František Vacín (25 May 1893 – 9 November 1965) was a Czech water polo player. He competed in the men's tournament at the 1924 Summer Olympics.

References

External links
 

1893 births
1965 deaths
Czechoslovak male water polo players
Olympic water polo players of Czechoslovakia
Water polo players at the 1924 Summer Olympics
Place of birth missing